K Ja Nu (also spelt K Jar Nu) is a well-known Burmese pop singer in Burma (Myanmar) of Kachin descent; she was most popular in the 1970s to 1980s. She began her singing in church and dabbled in music while attending Rangoon University, performing on the Kachin portion of the English-speaking Local Talent radio broadcasts and singing movie soundtracks. She graduated with a bachelor's degree in history in 1970 and continued learning music from her father, a lifelong musician. However, she did not enter the entertainment industry until December 1973, after her father granted permission, debuting with the song "Lawka go alya laik eik me". Among her biggest hits were "Our Shan Land's Festival", "Will You Buy Me Bogyoke Market?", and "Finding an Answer In Your Eyes". She currently resides in South Okkalapa Township in Yangon.

References

20th-century Burmese women singers
Living people
University of Yangon alumni
Burmese people of Kachin descent
Year of birth missing (living people)